Santambrogio is an Italian surname. It comes from Sant'Ambrogio meaning Saint Ambrose.  Notable people with the surname include:

Giacinto Santambrogio (1945–2012), Italian professional road racing cyclist
Mauro Santambrogio (born 1984), Italian professional road racing cyclist

See also
 Stephanie Sant’Ambrogio

Italian-language surnames